The 1926–27 New Zealand Māori rugby union tour was a collection of rugby union games undertaken by the New Zealand Māori team against invitational and national teams of New Zealand, Australia, France, Great Britain and Canada.

The matches

Preliminary 
Scores and results list NZ Maoris' points tally first.

Europe 
Scores and results list NZ Maoris' points tally first.

In Canada 
Scores and results list NZ Maoris' points tally first.

Bibliography 
All found on link

The Sydney Morning Herald, Monday 19 July 1926 p 17
The Sydney Morning Herald, Thursday 22 July 1926 p 15
The Brisbane Courier, Monday 2 August 1926 p 15
The Argus, Tuesday 3 August 1926 p 7
The Mercury, Friday 20 August 1926 p 12
Barrier Miner, Monday 13 September 1926 p 4
The Argus, Saturday 18 September 1926 p 30
The West Australian, Tuesday 21 September 1926 p 10
The West Australian, Saturday 25 September 1926 p 15
The Argus, Tuesday 28 September 1926 p 6
The Mercury, Saturday 2 October 1926 p 7
The West Australian, Tuesday 5 October 1926 p 13
The West Australian, Saturday 9 October 1926 p 17
The Brisbane Courier, Tuesday 12 October 1926 p 13
The West Australian, Monday 18 October 1926 p 13
The Brisbane Courier, Saturday 23 October 1926 p 11
The Sydney Morning Herald, Monday 25 October 1926 p 15
The Brisbane Courier, Friday 29 October 1926 p 8
The West Australian, Monday 1 November 1926 p 13
The Brisbane Courier, Friday 5 November 1926 p 15
The Brisbane Courier, Monday 8 November 1926 p 6
The Mercury, Friday 12 November 1926 p 4
The Brisbane Courier, Monday 15 November 1926 p 7
Cairns Post, Saturday 20 November 1926 p 5
The Brisbane Courier, Monday 22 November 1926 p 7
The Mercury, Friday 26 November 1926 p 11
The Sydney Morning Herald, Monday 29 November 1926 p 13
The Brisbane Courier, Friday 3 December 1926 p 5
Advocate (Burnie), Tuesday 7 December 1926 p 1
The Brisbane Courier, Saturday 11 December 1926 p 4
The Sydney Morning Herald, Tuesday 14 December 1926 p 14
The Brisbane Courier, Saturday 18 December 1926 p 5
The Argus, Tuesday 21 December 1926 p 8
The Sydney Morning Herald, Tuesday 28 December 1926 p 11
The Mercury, Thursday 30 December 1926 p 4
The Mercury, Monday 3 January 1927 p 2
The West Australian, Tuesday 1 February 1927 p 8
The Brisbane Courier, Friday 4 February 1927 p 5
The Brisbane Courier, Monday 7 February 1927 p 6
The West Australian, Friday 11 February 1927 p 15

Māori All Blacks tours
New Zealand Native
New Zealand Native
Maori rugby union
Maori rugby union
Rugby Union Tour
Rugby Union Tour
tour
tour
tour
tour
Rugby union tours of Australia
Rugby union tours of England
Rugby union tours of Ireland
Rugby union tours of Wales
Rugby union tours of France